Mariana Naval Base may refer to a United States Navy advance base on the Mariana Islands in the Pacific Ocean built during World War II:

Naval Base Guam
Naval Station Guam (disambiguation)
Naval Advance Base Saipan 
Tinian Naval Base
Mariana and Palau Islands campaign